Roy Lee Hutson (February 27, 1902 – May 20, 1957) played one year of Major League Baseball as an outfielder with the Brooklyn Robins in 1925. He played 7 games and had a .500 batting average.

Sources

1902 births
1957 deaths
Brooklyn Robins players
Major League Baseball left fielders
Baseball players from Missouri
Lawrence Merry Macks players
Jersey City Skeeters players
Topeka Jayhawks players
Okmulgee Drillers players
Shreveport Sports players
Mobile Marines players
Knoxville Smokies players
Spokane Hawks players
Attleboro Burros players